Ayr railway may refer to:

 Ayr to Mauchline Branch; in Scotland
 Ayr and Dalmellington Railway; in Scotland
 Ayr and Maybole Junction Railway; in Scotland
 Glasgow, Paisley, Kilmarnock and Ayr Railway; in Scotland
 Ayr Corporation Tramways; streetcar line in Scotland

See also
 Ayr (disambiguation)
 Ayr station (disambiguation)